Maximilian Ferdinand Wocke (27 November 1820, Breslau – 7 November 1906) was a German entomologist, specialising in Lepidoptera.
He was an apothecary and physician.

Selected works
 with Otto Staudinger(1861) Catalog der Lepidopteren Europa's und der angrenzenden Länder. Dresden (Staudinger & Burdach). XVI + 192 pp.
 with Otto Staudinger(1871) Catalog der Lepidopteren des Europaeischen Faunengebiets. Dresden (Burdach). XXXVII + 426 pp.online

References
 Anonym 1906: [Wocke, M. F.] Ann. Soc. Ent. Belgique 50 373
 Dittrich 1907: [Wocke, M. F.] Z. Ent. (N. F.) 32(N.F.) 35-46, Portr.
 Horn, Walther (H. R.) 1907: [Wocke, M. F.] - Dtsch. ent. Ztschr. 95 229-230

External links
 

German lepidopterists
1820 births
1906 deaths
Scientists from Wrocław